The 1960 Giro di Lombardia was the 54th edition of the Giro di Lombardia cycle race and was held on 16 October 1960. The race started and finished in Milan. The race was won by Emile Daems of the Philco team.

General classification

References

1960
Giro di Lombardia
Giro di Lombardia
1960 Super Prestige Pernod